Crenicichla jurubi is a species of cichlid native to South America. It is found in the Uruguay River basin, in tributaries of the upper Uruguay River, Brazil..

References

jurubi
Freshwater fish of Brazil
Taxa named by Carlos Alberto Santos de Lucena
Taxa named by Sven O. Kullander
Fish described in 1992